Arena Zimbrilor (also known as Stadionul Lascăr Ghineț) is a rugby stadium in Baia Mare, Romania. It opened in 1977 and has been the home stadium of Știința Baia Mare since its completion.

History
The stadium was built in 1977, the same year that the rugby union club Știința Baia Mare was founded. In 2009, the stadium had been renovated for the first time. In 2011, the stadium had been renovated for the second time.

References

Rugby union stadiums in Romania
Buildings and structures in Baia Mare